The 2014 Uruguay Open is a professional tennis tournament played on clay courts. It is the tenth edition of the tournament which is part of the 2014 ATP Challenger Tour. It will take place in Montevideo, Uruguay between November 15 and November 23, 2014.

Singles main-draw entrants

Seeds

 1 Rankings are as of November 10, 2014.

Other entrants
The following players received wildcards into the singles main draw:
  Pablo Cuevas
  Rodrigo Senattore
  Santiago Maresca
  Ariel Behar

The following players received entry from the qualifying draw:
  Manuel Barros
  Luciano Doria
  David Volfson
  Matías Buchhass

Champions

Singles

  Pablo Cuevas def.  Hugo Dellien, 6–2, 6–4

Doubles

  Martín Cuevas /  Pablo Cuevas def.  Nicolás Jarry /  Gonzalo Lama, 6–2, 6–4

External links
Official Website

Uruguay Open
Uruguay Open
Open